Geoffrey Ross Parker (born 31 March 1968 in Melbourne) captained the Under-19 Australian team for 3 tests and 12 ODI in the 1980s, including captaining them when they won the 1988 Youth World Cup, beating a Pakistan team (containing Inzamam-ul-Haq) in the final. He played 11 Youth tests in total and 19 ODIs. He made his first-class debut for Victoria in 1985 against the touring Indians – he scored 2 and took the wicket of Roger Binny. 

In 1990 Parker played 3 Lancashire League games for Church, he scored one century and took eleven wickets. He left Victoria at the end of the 1991/92 season but after nearly 5 years out of cricket he returned with South Australia for the 1996/97 season, he scored his maiden first-class century against his old team in his fourth game back. He scored his highest score and only other century in 1999 against Western Australia, he retired at the end of that season.

Parker played in 37 first-class games scoring 1,616 runs at an average of 26.93. He scored 2 centuries with a highest score of 117. He also took 6 wickets at an average of 40, his best bowling performance being 2/30.

Parker also played 28 List A games scoring 502 runs at an average of 22.81, his highest score was 83. He also took 3 List A wickets at an average of 90, his best bowling being 1/4.

He was also a gifted Australian rules footballer and played three VFL games for Essendon during the late 1980s.

He is currently the head recruiting manager for AFL club Port Adelaide. His nephew, Wil, also plays cricket for Victoria.

See also
 List of Victoria first-class cricketers

References

External links
Cricinfo Profile

1968 births
Living people
Australian cricketers
South Australia cricketers
Victoria cricketers
Australian rules footballers from Melbourne
Essendon Football Club players
Cricketers from Melbourne
People from Malvern, Victoria